Virtua Pro Football, known in Japan as , is a PlayStation 2 football simulation video game, released by Sega in 2006.

Summary

Teams & Competitions

Licenses
The game covers the top 6 European Leagues from the 2005/06 season but mainly featured with unlicensed competitions & teams, the only licensed clubs & leagues are the Spanish La Liga & Segunda Division, the Dutch Eredivisie & Eerste Divisie with full license respectively , while the Italian League name is unlicensed but with 33 licensed clubs out of 42 from Serie A & Serie B

Leagues
 Premiership
 League Championship
 League 1
 League 2
 Division 1
 Division 2
 1. Liga 
 2. Liga 
 Calcio A 1 
 Calcio B 2 
 La Liga L
 Segunda Division L
 Eredivisie L
 Eerste Divisie L

1 : League name unlicensed, with licensed teams except Cagliari, Palermo & Siena

2 : League name unlicensed, with licensed teams except Avellino, Bologna, Cesena, Cremonese, Mantova & Rimini

L : Full license

Competitions

 European League (32 team groups + knockout cup)
 Europa Cup (knockout cup with 24+8 teams)
 English Cup (32 team knockout cup)
 French Cup (32 team knockout cup)
 German Cup (32 team knockout cup)
 Italian Cup (24 team knockout cup)
 Spanish Cup (32 team knockout cup)
 Dutch Cup (26 team knockout cup)

 World Cup (32 team groups + knockout cup)
  European Cup (16 team groups + knockout cup)
 American Cup (12 team groups + knockout cup)
 African Cup (8 team knockout cup)
 Asian Cup (8 team knockout cup)

Other Clubs
This list features the teams from the other leagues of the world, all of them are unlicensed

Rest of Europe

 Athens G
 Athens YB
 Basel
 Belgrade BW
 Belgrade RW
 Besiktas
 Brondby
 Brugge
 Brussels
 Copenhagen
 Donetsk
 Glasgow City
 Glasgow FC
 Maccabi G
 Maccabi YB
 Istanbul F
 Istanbul G
 Kyiv
 Moscow L
 Lisbon R
 Lisbon G
 Piraeus
 Porto
 Prague
 Moscow RB
 Moscow S
 Trondheim
 Zagreb

Rest of the World

 Al Hilal
 A Nacional
 America
 Auckland
 Avellaneda
 Boston
 Chicago
 Corinthians
 Cruzeiro
 Dallas
 Flamengo
 Fluminense
 Guadalajara
 Independiente
 Internacional
 Iwata
 Kansas City
 Kashima
 La Boca
 Los Angeles
 Nagoya
 Necaxa
 O Asuncion
 O Caldas
 Palmeiras
 Pumas
 Quito
 R Plate
 Santos
 San Jose
 São Paulo
 Tigres
 Urawa
 Vasco da Gama
 Viñeazur
 Yokohama
 Washington

National Teams

Europe

Americas

Africa

Asia & Oceania

 
 
 
 1
 
 
 
 

1 : licensed only in the Japanese version

Stadiums
The stadiums that featured in the game appeared have a reference from real life with fake names

 Abbey Road Stadium
 Edmond Park
 Stanley Road Stadium
 Bridge Road Stadium
 Stade de Toulon
 Stade de Eiffel
 Stade Olympique
 Stade Tricoroll
 Ludwig Stadion
 Parkstadion
 Stadio Colosseum
 Stadio Garbaldi
 Stadio San Carlo
 Estadi St. Jerez
 Estadio de Cefiro
 Estadio do Lavender
 Estadio do Lisboa
 Estadio do Galore
 Benelux Arena

Vanguard Stadium
Twillight Stadium
Egbert Stadium
Hill Valley

Trivia
The former Italian footballer Roberto Baggio endorsed the Japanese version, having appeared in the TV commercial, flyer and merchandising.

See also
Let's Make a Soccer Team!

References

External links
Virtua Pro Football at MobyGames
Virtua Pro Football at GameFAQs
Virtua Pro Football at Giant Bomb

2006 video games
Association football video games
PlayStation 2 games
PlayStation 2-only games
Sega video games
Sports video games with career mode
Multiplayer and single-player video games
Video games developed in Japan